The Southern Comfort Conference is a major transgender conference that has taken place annually since 1991. It features seminars, events, and speeches by prominent people in the LGBT community, numerous vendors catering to transgender and transsexual people, and more. The event has become famous and today is known as the largest transgender conference in the United States. The event brings together transgender people, researchers, educators, therapists, doctors, and LGBT organizations fand offers scholarships to some attendees.

The conference provided the title for and is featured heavily in the 2001 documentary Southern Comfort, about the life and death of Robert Eads, whose goal in 1998 was to live long enough to attend the conference. Eads succeeded, and his speech at the conference is featured in the documentary. In honor of the memory of Eads, the conference offers health exams through the annual "Robert Eads Health Project" in collaboration with the Trans Health Initiative at the Feminist Women's Health Center.

The conference has built a reputation as a safe place for LGBT people with a familial atmosphere, and aims at inclusiveness. It attracts people from all over the United States, offering the opportunity for social and other interaction.
From the conference's founding in 1991 until 2014, the conference was held in Atlanta, Georgia. At the conclusion of the 2014 Southern Comfort Conference, the board of directors announced that SCC 2015-2017 would be held in Fort Lauderdale, Florida.

With support from the Greater Fort Lauderdale Convention and Visitor Bureau, the 2017 conference was to be held from September 14–17 at The Riverside Hotel in Fort Lauderdale However it was cancelled because of Hurricane Irma. The 2018 and 2019 conferences returned to the Riverside. The conference was cancelled in 2020 an 2021 due to COVID-19 concerns but the conference website states it looks to bring the conference back in the future.

See also

References

External links
Southern Comfort conference website and general information

Transgender events
LGBT events in Georgia (U.S. state)
Transgender organizations in the United States
LGBT conferences
LGBT culture in Miami
LGBT events in Florida
Conferences in the United States
1991 establishments in Georgia (U.S. state)